Roland Sampath (born 21 June 1957) is a Trinidadian cricketer. He played in nineteen first-class and eight List A matches for Trinidad and Tobago from 1975 to 1985.

See also
 List of Trinidadian representative cricketers

References

External links
 

1957 births
Living people
Trinidad and Tobago cricketers